John Fish may refer to:

John Fish (businessman), American businessman
John Charles Lounsbury Fish (1870–1962), professor of civil engineering
Sir John Fish, 1st Baronet (died 1623), of the Fish baronets
Jack Fish (American football), American football coach
Jack Fish (rugby league) (1878–1940), English rugby league footballer

See also
Jack Fish (disambiguation)